Mallampalli  is a village and a mandal in Warangal district in the state of Telangana in India.

References

Villages in Warangal district
Mandal headquarters in Warangal district